The 2016 Red Bull Air Race of Lausitz was the sixth round of the 2016 Red Bull Air Race World Championship season, the eleventh season of the Red Bull Air Race World Championship. The event was held at the Lausitzring in the Brandenburg state of Germany.

This was the last event before the death of the 2008 champion Hannes Arch.

Master Class

Qualification

Round of 14

 Pilot received 2 seconds in penalties.

Round of 8

 Pilot received 3 seconds in penalties.

Final 4

Challenger Class

Results

Standings after the event

Master Class standings

Challenger Class standings

 Note: Only the top five positions are included for both sets of standings.

References

External links

|- style="text-align:center"
|width="35%"|Previous race:2016 Red Bull Air Race of Ascot
|width="30%"|Red Bull Air Race2016 season
|width="35%"|Next race:2016 Red Bull Air Race of Indianapolis
|- style="text-align:center"
|width="35%"|Previous race:2010 Red Bull Air Race of Lausitz
|width="30%"|Red Bull Air Race of Lausitz
|width="35%"|Next race:2017 Red Bull Air Race of Lausitz
|- style="text-align:center"

Lausitz
Red Bull Air Race World Championship
Red Bull Air Race World Championship, Lausitz